IWL may refer to:

Industriewerke Ludwigsfelde
International Workers League (Fourth International)
International Wrestling League
Israeli Wrestling League
Indian Women's League
Intentional weight loss